Anthony Speirs (born 1 May 1968) was a Scottish footballer who played for Stenhousemuir, East Fife, Dumbarton and East Stirlingshire.

References

1968 births
Scottish footballers
Dumbarton F.C. players
East Fife F.C. players
East Stirlingshire F.C. players
Stenhousemuir F.C. players
Scottish Football League players
Living people
Association football midfielders